10th Visual Effects Society Awards
February 7, 2012

Best Visual Effects in a Visual Effects Driven Motion Picture:
Rise of the Planet of the Apes

The 10th Visual Effects Society Awards was held in Los Angeles at the Beverly Hilton Hotel on February 7, 2012, in honor to the best visual effects in film and television of 2011. The show was hosted by Patton Oswalt and broadcast, in edited form, on the ReelzChannel on February 19, 2012.

Winners and nominees
(winners in bold)

Honorary Awards
Lifetime Achievement Award:
Stan Lee
Georges Méliès Award:
Douglas Trumbull

Film

Television

Other categories

References

External links
 Visual Effects Society

2011
Visual Effects Society Awards
Visual Effects Society Awards
Visual Effects Society Awards
Visual Effects Society Awards
Visual Effects Society Awards